Pabna-2 is a constituency represented in the Jatiya Sangsad (National Parliament) of Bangladesh since 2019 by Ahmed Firoz Kabir of the Awami League.

Boundaries 
The constituency encompasses Sujanagar Upazila and the five southernmost union parishads of Bera Upazila: Dhalar Char, Jatsakhni, Masundia, Puran Bharenga, and Ruppur.

History 
The constituency was created for the first general elections in newly independent Bangladesh, held in 1973.

Members of Parliament

Elections

Elections in the 2010s 
Azizul Huq Arzu was elected unopposed in the 2014 general election after opposition parties withdrew their candidacies in a boycott of the election.

Elections in the 2000s

Elections in the 1990s 
Ahmed Tafiz Uddin died in June 1998. A. K. Khandker of the Awami League was elected in a December by-election.

References

External links
 

Parliamentary constituencies in Bangladesh
Pabna District